Cortes de Aragón may refer to:

 Aragonese Corts, the historical and present legislature of Aragon
 Cortes de Aragón, municipality in the province of Teruel, Aragon, Spain